James Cotton (1935–2017) was an American blues musician.

James Cotton may also refer to:
James Cotton (basketball) (born 1975), American basketball player
James Cotton (gridiron football) (born 1976), American and Canadian football defensive end
James Cotton (priest) (1780–1862), English clergyman and Dean of Bangor 
James Sutherland Cotton (1847–1918), British man of letters